James Thomas Schleifer is an American historian, and emeritus Dean of the Mother Irene Gill Memorial Library, and professor at the College of New Rochelle.

Life
He graduated from Yale University with a Ph.D. in 1972.  He also lectures at Yale University.

Awards
 1981 Merle Curti Award

Works
"Tocqueville: Écrits et discours politiques". LA REVUE TOCQUEVILLE / THE TOCQUEVILLE REVIEW, VOL. XIII No. 2, 1992

References

College of New Rochelle faculty
Yale University faculty
Living people
Yale University alumni
21st-century American historians
21st-century American male writers
Year of birth missing (living people)
American male non-fiction writers